KIAQ (96.9  FM) is a commercial radio station that serves the Fort Dodge, Iowa area.  The station broadcasts a country music format.  KIAQ is owned by Alpha Media, through licensee Digity 3E License, LLC.

History
The station was originally licensed as KRIT but changed callsigns to KIAQ on September 1, 1992.

In addition to its modern country music format, the station also provides local, regional and national news coverage, weather, sports and daily agriculture reports. KIAQ also broadcasts the University of Iowa football and basketball games.

The transmitter and broadcast tower are located four miles north of Badger, Iowa, along Hwy P52. The tower is also used by KLFG, which has its antenna array mounted at the  level.

References

External links
KIAQ website

IAQ
Radio stations established in 1992
Alpha Media radio stations
1992 establishments in Iowa
Fort Dodge, Iowa